Desmond Joseph Ferrow (29 October 1933 – 5 December 2020) was a New Zealand cricketer. He played in four first-class matches for Northern Districts from 1956 to 1958.

Ferrow was an off-spin bowler who took his best first-class figures of 4 for 50 in Northern Districts' inaugural first-class match in the 1956-57 Plunket Shield. He played for many years for Bay of Plenty, and holds their record for the best match figures of 13 for 51 (7 for 35 and 6 for 16) against King Country in 1960. In 1956 he was the first Bay of Plenty bowler to take 10 wickets in a match.

See also
 List of Northern Districts representative cricketers

References

External links
 

1933 births
2020 deaths
New Zealand cricketers
Northern Districts cricketers
Sportspeople from Wollongong